Åsane Fotball is a Norwegian football club located in Åsane. The club currently plays in 1. divisjon, the second tier of the Norwegian football league system, where they have been played since they promoted from the 2019 2. divisjon. They were relegated from 1. divisjon in 2018.

Recent history

{|class="wikitable"
|-bgcolor="#efefef"
! Season
!
! Pos.
! Pl.
! W
! D
! L
! GS
! GA
! P
!Cup
!Notes
|-
|2001
|2. divisjon
|align=right bgcolor=#DDFFDD|1
|align=right|26||align=right|19||align=right|4||align=right|3
|align=right|57||align=right|17||align=right|61
|First round
|Promoted to the 1. divisjon
|-
|2002
|1. divisjon
|align=right bgcolor="#FFCCCC"| 13
|align=right|30||align=right|8||align=right|4||align=right|18
|align=right|41||align=right|59||align=right|28
|Second round
|Relegated to the 2. divisjon
|-
|2003
|2. divisjon
|align=right |3
|align=right|26||align=right|15||align=right|3||align=right|8
|align=right|69||align=right|41||align=right|48
|First round
|
|-
|2004
|2. divisjon
|align=right |3
|align=right|26||align=right|13||align=right|3||align=right|10
|align=right|52||align=right|37||align=right|42
|First round
|
|-
|2005
|2. divisjon
|align=right |9
|align=right|26||align=right|10||align=right|3||align=right|13
|align=right|36||align=right|47||align=right|33
|First round
|
|-
|2006
|2. divisjon
|align=right |10
|align=right|26||align=right|8||align=right|3||align=right|15
|align=right|37||align=right|47||align=right|27
|First round
|
|-
|2007
|2. divisjon
|align=right |12
|align=right|26||align=right|8||align=right|1||align=right|17
|align=right|32||align=right|53||align=right|25
|Second round
|Avoided relegation due to the relegation of the reserve teams of Start and Odd Grenland
|-
|2008
|2. divisjon
|align=right |6
|align=right|26||align=right|11||align=right|4||align=right|11
|align=right|56||align=right|53||align=right|37
|Second round
|
|-
|2009
|2. divisjon
|align=right |4
|align=right|26||align=right|15||align=right|4||align=right|7
|align=right|57||align=right|31||align=right|49
|Second round
|
|-
|2010
|2. divisjon
|align=right |6
|align=right|26||align=right|11||align=right|5||align=right|10
|align=right|49||align=right|46||align=right|38
|First round
| 
|-
|2011
|2. divisjon
|align=right |4
|align=right|26||align=right|11||align=right|7||align=right|8
|align=right|51||align=right|42||align=right|40
|Third round
| 
|-
|2012
|2. divisjon
|align=right |3
|align=right|26||align=right|11||align=right|7||align=right|8
|align=right|46||align=right|44||align=right|40
|Third round
|
|-
|2013
|2. divisjon
|align=right |10
|align=right|26||align=right|10||align=right|3||align=right|13
|align=right|45||align=right|48||align=right|33
|Second round
|
|-
|2014
|2. divisjon
|align=right bgcolor=#DDFFDD| 1
|align=right|26||align=right|17||align=right|4||align=right|5
|align=right|70||align=right|27||align=right|55
|Second round
|Promoted to the 1. divisjon
|-
|2015
|1. divisjon
|align=right |11
|align=right|30||align=right|8||align=right|11||align=right|11
|align=right|46||align=right|46||align=right|35
|Fourth round
|
|-
|2016 
|1. divisjon
|align=right |10
|align=right|30||align=right|10||align=right|8||align=right|12
|align=right|36||align=right|37||align=right|38
||Third round
|
|-
|2017 
|1. divisjon
|align=right |12
|align=right|30||align=right|7||align=right|12||align=right|11
|align=right|38||align=right|56||align=right|33
||Third round
|
|-
|2018 
|1. divisjon
|align=right bgcolor="#FFCCCC"| 14
|align=right|30||align=right|9||align=right|6||align=right|15
|align=right|38||align=right|57||align=right|33
||Second round
|Relegated to the 2. divisjon through play-offs
|-
|2019 
|2. divisjon
|align=right bgcolor=#DDFFDD| 2
|align=right|26||align=right|15||align=right|5||align=right|6
|align=right|66||align=right|31||align=right|50
||Second round
||Promoted to the 1. divisjon through play-offs
|-
|2020 
|1. divisjon
|align=right |5
|align=right|30||align=right|12||align=right|9||align=right|9
|align=right|60||align=right|48||align=right|45
||Cancelled
|
|-
|2021 
|1. divisjon
|align=right |7
|align=right|30||align=right|11||align=right|7||align=right|12
|align=right|44||align=right|53||align=right|40
||Fourth round
|
|-
|2022
|1. divisjon
|align=right |13
|align=right|30||align=right|8||align=right|8||align=right|14
|align=right|42||align=right|67||align=right|32
||First round
|
|}
Source:

Current squad

Åsane Fotball Damer

Åsane Fotball Damer is a Norwegian women's football club located in Åsane, Bergen, Norway. It currently plays in the First Division, the second tier of Norwegian football, where they have played since they were promoted in 2011. The club was formed in 1997, when the sports club Åsane Idrettslag, which encompassed men's and women's teams in various sports, split up into eight different clubs, including Åsane Fotball Damer (the women's football team) and Åsane Fotball (the men's football team), which now constitute separate legal entities, but continue to collaborate. As of 2012, the club has 180 playing members in all age groups, from 7 years old to senior level.

Recent history
{|class="wikitable"
|-bgcolor="#efefef"
! Season
!
! Pos.
! Pl.
! W
! D
! L
! GS
! GA
! P
!Cup
!Notes
|-
|2004
|2. Division, section 4
|align=right bgcolor=red|9
|align=right|18||align=right|3||align=right|4||align=right|11
|align=right|19||align=right|51||align=right|13
|
|Relegated to 3. Division
|-
|2005
|3. Division, Hordaland
|align=right bgcolor=silver|2
|align=right|16||align=right|10||align=right|4||align=right|2
|align=right|51||align=right|12||align=right|34
|
|
|-
|2006
|3. Division, Hordaland
|align=right bgcolor=gold|1
|align=right|14||align=right|12||align=right|1||align=right|1
|align=right|64||align=right|11||align=right|37
|
|Promoted to 2. Division
|-
|2007
|2. Division / 4
|align=right |4
|align=right|18||align=right|11||align=right|0||align=right|7
|align=right|44||align=right|36||align=right|33
|
|
|-
|2008
|2. Division / 4
|align=right |4
|align=right|18||align=right|9||align=right|1||align=right|8
|align=right|41||align=right|54||align=right|28
|1st round
|
|-
|2009
|2. Division / 4
|align=right |4
|align=right|18||align=right|8||align=right|4||align=right|6
|align=right|30||align=right|30||align=right|28
|2nd round
|
|-
|2010
|2. Division / 4
|align=right bgcolor=cc9966|3
|align=right|22||align=right|14||align=right|4||align=right|4
|align=right|74||align=right|28||align=right|46
|2nd round
| 
|-
|2011
|2. Division / 4
|align=right bgcolor=gold|1
|align=right|22||align=right|20||align=right|2||align=right|0
|align=right|113||align=right|13||align=right|62
|2nd round
|Promoted to 1. Division
|-
|2012
|1. Division
|align=right |7
|align=right|22||align=right|8||align=right|4||align=right|10
|align=right|33||align=right|36||align=right|28
|1st round
|
|-
|2013
|1. Division
|align=right bgcolor=cc9966|3
| align="right" |20|| align="right" |12||align=right|2|| align="right" |6
| align="right" |44|| align="right" |33||align=right|38
|2nd round
|
|-
|2014
|1. Division
|align=right |10
| align="right" |22|| align="right" |5||align=right|5|| align="right" |12
| align="right" |19|| align="right" |41||align=right|20
|1st round
|
|-
|2015
|1. Division
|align=right |3
| align="right" |22|| align="right" |12||align=right|6|| align="right" |4
| align="right" |40|| align="right" |20||align=right|42
|2nd round
|
|-
|2016
|1. Division
|align=right |8
| align="right" |22|| align="right" |8||align=right|2|| align="right" |12
| align="right" |37|| align="right" |31||align=right|26
|2nd round
|
|-
|2017
|1. Division
|align=right |6
| align="right" |22|| align="right" |9||align=right|3|| align="right" |10
| align="right" |26|| align="right" |29||align=right|30
|2nd round
|
|-
|2018
|1. Division
|align=right |8
| align="right" |22|| align="right" |8||align=right|4|| align="right" |10
| align="right" |29|| align="right" |25||align=right|28
|2nd round
|
|-
|2019
|1. Division
|align=right |7
| align="right" |22|| align="right" |9||align=right|5|| align="right" |8
| align="right" |38|| align="right" |33||align=right|32
|2nd round
|
|-
|2020
|1. Division
|align=right |5
| align="right" |18|| align="right" |10||align=right|2|| align="right" |6
| align="right" |43|| align="right" |23||align=right|32
|Preliminary round
|
|}

References

External links
  – men's team
  – women's team

 
Football clubs in Norway
Sport in Bergen
Association football clubs established in 1971
1971 establishments in Norway
Association football clubs established in 1997
1997 establishments in Norway